ZC-B (3-(4-bromo-2,5-dimethoxyphenyl)azetidine) is a phenethylamine derivative which acts as a serotonin receptor agonist selective for the 5-HT2 subtypes, with an EC50 of 1.6nM at 5-HT2A, vs 5.8nM at 5-HT2C. It is related to psychedelic phenethylamine derivatives such as 2C-B, but with the ethylamine side chain replaced by an azetidine ring.

See also 
 DOB
 β-Methyl-2C-B
 4C-B
 TCB-2
 LSZ

References 

Designer drugs
Serotonin receptor agonists
Azetidines
Bromoarenes
Methoxy compounds